is a district located in Nagano Prefecture, Japan.

As of November 1, 2005, the district has an estimated population of 34,759. The total area is 1,546.26 km2.

Historically, the district was once known as Nishichikuma District (西筑摩郡) until May 1, 1968.

There are only three towns and three villages within the district.
 Agematsu
 Kiso Town
 Nagiso
 Kiso Village
 Ōkuwa
 Ōtaki

History 
 May 1, 1968 – The district was renamed to Kiso District.
 February 13, 2005 – The village of Yamaguchi merged into the city of Nakatsugawa, Gifu. 
 April 1, 2005 – The village of Narakawa merged into the city of Shiojiri.
 November 1, 2005 – The town of Kisofukushima merged with the villages of Mitake, Hiyoshi and Kaida to form the new town of Kiso.

Points of interest 
 Nakasendō, a former trade route between Edo (modern-day Tokyo) and Kyoto.
 Tsumago-juku, a restored post town on the Nakasendō.

See also 
 Kisobushi
 Kiso Valley

References

External links 

Districts in Nagano Prefecture